Mistrzejowice is one of the 18 districts of Kraków; known as Dzielnica XV (District 15), located in the northern part of the city. The name Mistrzejowice comes from a village of same name (first mentioned in 1270) that is now a part of the district. 

Subdivisions of Mistrzejowice
Mistrzejowice is divided into smaller subdivisions (osiedles). Here's a list of them.
 Batowice
 Dziekanowice
 Mistrzejowice
 Osiedle Bohaterów Września
 Osiedle Kombatantów
 Osiedle Mistrzejowice Nowe
 Osiedle Oświecenia
 Osiedle Piastów
 Osiedle Srebrnych Orłów
 Osiedle Tysiąclecia
 Osiedle Złotego Wieku

Population

References

External links
 Official website of Mistrzejowice
 Biuletyn Informacji Publicznej

Districts of Kraków